The 1970 Northwest Territories general election took place on December 21, 1970. It took place during the centennial of the territory.

Among the festivities earlier in the year was an official visit by Queen Elizabeth II to open the first Arctic Winter games in Yellowknife. The world-famous Polar Bear licence plate was also unveiled.

The centenary election brought up a number of old issues that have been seen in many elections in the past 100 years, mainly the transfer of powers from the federal government to the territory, full self-government, and rights for natives.

This was the first election in which a woman, Lena Pedersen was elected to the Territorial Legislature. She was one of ten elected members and four appointed members who would sit on the council.

The voting age for this election was lowered from 21 to 19.

Election summary

Appointed members

Members of the Legislative Assembly elected
For complete electoral history, see individual districts

References

1970 elections in Canada
Elections in the Northwest Territories
December 1970 events in Canada
1970 in the Northwest Territories